Cambridge Scholars Publishing (CSP) is an academic book publisher based in Newcastle upon Tyne, England.  It is not affiliated with the University of Cambridge or Cambridge University Press.

The company publishes in health science, life science, physical science and social science. In 2018 it published 729 books.

Journal publishing
The company previously published academic journals including the discontinued titles Zambia Social Sciences Journal and Review Journal of Political Philosophy. However, as of 2020, Cambridge Scholars did not publish any journals/periodicals.

Reception
The company has received a mixed reception. It has been criticised "as being overly reliant on contributors to perform even basic copy editing of the texts" and a reviewer said of a book that "it gets stuck in a quagmire of editorial and copy-editing issues that simply shouldn't have been allowed to occur if proper quality control was exercised by Cambridge Scholars Publishing".

Although it was not included on the original Beall's List of predatory publishers, it was included on an updated list on beallslist.net, managed by an unidentified source and not by Beall himself. David H. Kaye's Flaky Academic Journals notes that "the journals do not look stellar; no editorial boards are listed." As of 2020, editorial boards are now listed.

Cambridge Scholars made an official statement on the site in December 2018 entitled 'In Defense of Cambridge Scholars' in which an adviser commented on the statements made on the site stating "There are no charges to publish. There is no requirement on authors for a buy-back in return for publication. Royalties are accrued to the author from the first sale of a title. Decisions to publish are not taken on likely sales or profitability (which is unusual in a commercial publisher). The commercial risk to publish rests entirely with CSP."

In 2019, the publisher's rating in the Norwegian Scientific Index was downgraded to "Scientific level 0" (i.e. non-academic), though this decision was reversed in 2020. The company is listed in the Clarivate Analytics Web of Science Master Book List.

History
The company was founded in 2001 by former Cambridge University academics. It relocated to Newcastle when its founders moved to Durham University, and was subsequently sold to a group of Newcastle-based business-people when the original owner left the UK in 2010. The company is now co-owned and managed by Graeme Nicol who bought the company from the original owner in 2011.

Premises

The firm is based in the Lady Stephenson Library, a building that was commissioned in 1908 to house one of Newcastle's early public libraries, given to the city by William Haswell Stephenson and named for his wife Eliza Mary  Bond, who had died aged 67 in 1901. The building is now the location of four registered companies.

References

External links

Academic publishing companies
Book publishing companies of England
Companies based in Newcastle upon Tyne